Amate is a station of the Seville Metro on the line 1. It is located at the intersection of Los Gavilanes Av. and Puerto del Escudo St., in the neighborhood of Parque Amate. Amate is an underground station, located between 1º de Mayo and La Plata stations on the same line. It was opened on 2 April 2009.

See also 
 List of Seville metro stations

References

External links 
  Official site.
 History, construction details and maps.

Seville Metro stations
Railway stations in Spain opened in 2009